Diplocheila oregona is a species of ground beetle in the family Carabidae. It has is found in North America from Nevada and Utah up to British Columbia and Manitoba.

References

Further reading

 

Harpalinae
Articles created by Qbugbot
Beetles described in 1951